Salomon (died 874) was Count of Rennes and Nantes from 852 and Duke of Brittany from 857 until his death by assassination. He used the title King of Brittany intermittently after 868. In 867, he was granted the counties of Avranches and Coutances. 

In popular tradition within Brittany he was canonised as "Saint Salomon" after his death and raised to the rank of martyr.

Rise under Erispoe
Salomon was the son of Riwallon III of Poher. In 851, Charles the Bald, after his defeat at the Battle of Jengland, made peace with Erispoe, the Breton duke, and granted him the counties of Rennes and Nantes and the Pays de Retz in Poitou as far as the river Mayenne. In 852, Salomon swore an oath to Charles and became his loyal follower (fidelis); in return, in a manner similar to Erispoe, he was granted Rennes, Nantes, and Retz as a "third" of Brittany to be held from Charles in fee. He and Erispoe were the dominatores of Rennes in 853. Salomon was the most powerful aristocrat at Erispoe's court.

Revolt of 858–863
Probably because he feared losing his benefices (which he held under Erispoe) if Louis the Stammerer were allowed to become king at Le Mans, Salomon colluded with the otherwise unknown Almarchus to assassinate his cousin Erispoe and seize the Breton throne in 857. In 858, he was behind the large-scale revolt of the Frankish nobles of Neustria against Charles the Bald. Bretons were involved in the chasing of Louis from Le Mans in Spring that year. In September, Louis the German marched as far as Orléans, where a Breton delegation from Salomon met him and took oaths on Salomon's behalf. In 859, a synod met at Savonnières near Toul and tried to order Salomon to remember his oath of 852 and to resume paying the tribute which Brittany had paid in years past.

By 862, Salomon was the centre of the revolt against Charles the Bald, though he had not made war on the king himself since 860. In that year he hired the services of a band of Vikings with which to fight Robert the Strong, who himself had hired mercenary Vikings to help him. Salomon also lent a force of Bretons to aid Louis the Stammerer, now in league with the rebels, in his war with Robert. In 863, Charles gathered an army and began marching on Brittany, but held off near Entrammes and negotiated a peace with Salomon whereby western Anjou was recognised as a part of Brittany and the lay abbacy of Saint-Aubin in Angers was granted to Salomon, who commended himself to Charles and paid tribute.

Revolt of 865–867
Salomon did not give up his war with Robert or his alliance with the Vikings quite so readily, however. In 865 and 866, the Vikings and Bretons ravaged the vicinity of Le Mans and Robert was killed in the Battle of Brissarthe against the Vikings allied with the Bretons. This was the start of a new insurrection; even Pope Nicholas I wrote letters to Salomon urging him to resume the halted tribute payments. Charles marched on Brittany in 867, but Salomon sent his son-in-law Pascweten to negotiate a peace at Compiègne in August. Charles sent hostages to Salomon and Pascweten swore oaths of fealty to Charles on Salomon's behalf.

Peace and regalia
This peace was to last until the end of Salomon's life. Charles rewarded his now faithful vassal with a gift of regalia in 868, including a golden, jewelled crown. It is also likely that Salomon's two-year-old son Wigo was baptised on this occasion and that Charles acted as godfather to him, thus making Salomon and Charles linked by "blood" as co-fathers. Though Salomon thereafter began to call himself king, he was not king in any official capacity, as an eleventh-century historian at Redon monastery wrote:
Salomon was called king, not because it was true in fact, but because he wore a gold coronet and purple robes by a grant of the Emperor Charles, and for this reason was designated by this name.

Salomon expended some effort in the mid-860s trying to have Pope Nicholas send the pallium to the Bishop of Dol to create an archdiocese for all the Breton bishoprics, which did not recognise the Archdiocese of Tours, their legal metropolitan. Salomon may have wanted an archbishop which was pliable to his wishes or who could consecrate him as king. Perhaps he simply wished to break the deadlock which had ensued following Nominoe's deposition of five Breton bishops a decade and a half earlier.

In 874, a conspiracy involving Pascweten, Wrhwant, and Wigo, son of Riwallon, Count of Cornouaille, plotted to kill Salomon. This they did, though they quickly fell out with each other and a civil war followed until 876.

Veneration 
Solomon III of Bretagne is honored in the Catholic Church on 25 June.

See also
Kings and dukes of Brittany family tree

References

874 deaths
9th-century rulers of Brittany
9th-century murdered monarchs
Dukes of Brittany
Assassinated royalty
Year of birth unknown
9th-century deaths
9th-century Christian saints
9th-century Christian martyrs
Saints from the Carolingian Empire
Medieval Breton saints
Medieval French saints
French Roman Catholic saints
Christian royal saints
Roman Catholic royal saints
Sons of kings
9th-century monarchs in Europe
Catholic martyrs
Christian monarchs
Military saints